The Bensley Baronetcy, of Saint Marylebone in the County of Middlesex, was a title in the Baronetage of the United Kingdom. It was created on 25 June 1801 for William Bensley, a Director of the Honourable East India Company. The title became extinct on his death in 1809.

Bensley baronets, of Saint Marylebone (1801)
Sir William Bensley, 1st Baronet (c. 1737–1809)

References

Extinct baronetcies in the Baronetage of the United Kingdom